

The Gunnar Mine was a uranium mine in northern Saskatchewan, Canada located around  southwest of the community of Uranium City, and approximately 600 km north of Saskatoon. The mine was situated on the Crackingstone Peninsula on the north shore of Lake Athabasca in the Beaverlodge Uranium District.

The Gunnar deposit was discovered in July 1952, and the mine operated as both an open pit (1955–1961) and underground (1957–1963). The mine ceased production in 1963.

The Gunnar Mine headframe was demolished on August 4, 2011 but not decommissioning in any meaningful way.

As of 2020, the mine was being decommissioned by the Saskatchewan Research Council who have a license to operate the site until 2024.

In 2019 the Canadian Nuclear Safety Commission inspection found overall good performance, but some errors with regards to controlling radioactive zones and labeling radioactive materials. These non-compliant acts were descried as having "low safety significance," but issued enforcement notices

Geology

The Gunnar uranium deposit occurred in Precambrian altered granitic gneiss.

See also
Eldorado, Saskatchewan
Lorado Mine
Uranium ore deposits

References

External links

Uranium mines in Canada
Mines in Saskatchewan
Surface mines in Canada
Underground mines in Canada
Lake Athabasca
Uranium City, Saskatchewan
Northern Saskatchewan Administration District